The second generation (Generation II) of the Pokémon franchise features 100 fictional species of creatures introduced to the core video game series in the 1999 Game Boy Color games Pokémon Gold and Silver, set in the Johto region. Some Pokémon in this generation were introduced in animated adaptations of the franchise before Gold and Silver, such as Ho-Oh in the first episode of the Pokémon anime series in 1998 and 1999, Togepi, which was a recurring character in the anime owned by Misty, Donphan in the Pokémon first movie in 1998, Snubbull in the first Pikachu short movie in 1998, and Marill, which also debuted in that short film and was a recurring character in the anime owned by Tracey Sketchit in 1998 and 1999. Elekid, Bellossom, Ledyba, and Hoothoot debuted in Pikachu's Rescue Adventure and Lugia and Slowking debuted in Pokémon 2000. 

The following list details the 100 Pokémon of Generation II in order of their National Pokédex number. The first Pokémon, Chikorita, is number 152 and the last, Celebi, is number 251. Alternate forms that result in type changes are included for convenience. Mega evolutions and regional forms are included on the pages for the generation in which they were introduced.

Design and development
Two new types were introduced in Pokémon Gold and Silver – namely the "Dark" and "Steel" types – which were intended to better balance the gameplay of Pokémon battles. Dark and Steel types fare well against "Psychic" attacks, which was a dominant type in Red and Blue. The concept of breeding was introduced in the second generation of Pokémon games as well, which allows players to manipulate the skills of their Pokémon to a greater degree. Some of the new Pokémon introduced in Gold and Silver are pre-evolutions of other Pokémon, such as Pichu and Igglybuff. These baby Pokémon are only available by breeding their evolved forms.

Pokémon Gold and Silver were first revealed at Nintendo Space World in 1997. At this point, the game had a massively larger world map than the final game and this prototype featured around 40 Pokémon designs that were removed and replaced when the games were released in 1999.

List of Pokémon

 Chikorita
 Bayleef
 Meganium
 Cyndaquil
 Quilava
 Typhlosion
 Totodile
 Croconaw
 Feraligatr
 Sentret
 Furret
 Hoothoot
 Noctowl
 Ledyba
 Ledian
 Spinarak
 Ariados
 Crobat
 Chinchou
 Lanturn
 Pichu
 Cleffa
 Igglybuff
 Togepi
 Togetic
 Natu
 Xatu
 Mareep
 Flaaffy
 Ampharos
 Bellossom
 Marill
 Azumarill
 Sudowoodo
 Politoed
 Hoppip
 Skiploom
 Jumpluff
 Aipom
 Sunkern
 Sunflora
 Yanma
 Wooper
 Quagsire
 Espeon
 Umbreon
 Murkrow
 Slowking
 Misdreavus
 Unown
 Wobbuffet
 Girafarig
 Pineco
 Forretress
 Dunsparce
 Gligar
 Steelix
 Snubbull
 Granbull
 Qwilfish
 Scizor
 Shuckle
 Heracross
 Sneasel
 Teddiursa
 Ursaring
 Slugma
 Magcargo
 Swinub
 Piloswine
 Corsola
 Remoraid
 Octillery
 Delibird
 Mantine
 Skarmory
 Houndour
 Houndoom
 Kingdra
 Phanpy
 Donphan
 Porygon2
 Stantler
 Smeargle
 Tyrogue
 Hitmontop
 Smoochum
 Elekid
 Magby
 Miltank
 Blissey
 Raikou
 Entei
 Suicune
 Larvitar
 Pupitar
 Tyranitar
 Lugia
 Ho-Oh
 Celebi

Notes

References

Lists of Pokémon
Video game characters introduced in 1999